Caloptilia titanitis is a moth of the family Gracillariidae. the species originates from South Africa.

References

Endemic moths of South Africa
titanitis
Moths of Africa
Moths described in 1921